Beth McKee is an American singer-songwriter.

Biography 
McKee is from Jackson, Mississippi, and has also lived in Louisiana, Texas, and Florida. She worked as a pianist as early as age 14, but had few professional female musician role models and chose to pursue a degree in accounting from Millsaps College.  After deciding to change her career path, McKee moved to Austin, TX, and became an active part of the music scene. She was invited to tour with her hometown friend Greg "Fingers" Taylor as a member of his female backing band The Ladyfingers for Jimmy Buffett's summer tour in 1990. When the tour ended she moved to New Orleans to join the band Evangeline, providing keyboards, accordion, and vocals.  Two months after McKee joined the band Jimmy Buffett, signed Evangeline to his MCA Nashville imprint, Margaritaville Records, and toured as his opening act.  The group was successful for a time, and disbanded in the late 1990s.

McKee moved to Orlando, Florida, and eventually released I'm That Way in 2009, an album of Bobby Charles covers. Charles was so pleased with her interpretations of his songs that he invited her to sing with him on his final recording Timeless. "I'm That Way" was followed by Next to Nowhere in 2012 "Sugarcane Revival" in 2015, and "Dreamwood Acres" in 2018.  McKee's music has found a resonance with a community and 501(c)3 non-profit organization she established dubbed "Swamp Sistas La La Foundation."  The grassroots organization has a bifold mission of community service and supporting women in the arts. . Membership in the Facebook group exceeded 1,500 members in June 2012, and is currently nearing 2,500.  McKee describes her perceptions of the group:
"We have one foot in our roots, one foot pointed ahead, we celebrate what we have in common and learn from each other about what we don't."
With the help of the Swamp Sistas, McKee hosts a roving musical festival called the Swamp Sistas La La, a modern twist on the traditional Louisiana Creole houseparty to raise funds for a communal cause. In 2015, McKee help a Swamp Sista La La in Orlando as part of the Fringe Festival to support the Second Harvest Food Bank, The PEAS Foundation, and The Fresh Stop Bus. The Swamp Sistas originated as a Facebook group in 2010 as a way for McKee to stay connected with women friends she met while on tour as a solo artist throughout the South. Since then, the online group has grown to nearly 2,600 members. The chimera organization—equal parts support group, philanthropic group, performance group—is still evolving. July 26, 2016  Music With a Mission, Orlando Magazine.

Music 
McKee has been compared to Bonnie Raitt, Linda Ronstadt, and Loretta Lynn.  Her music features a variety of influences, including blues, Zydeco, Southern rock, country, and gospel. On The Morton Report, Bill Bentley described her 2015 release Sugarcane Revival as "kind of like if Laura Nyro had been roommates with Carole King and Bonnie Raitt on Decatur Street in the French Quarter during the ‘70s." 
McKee has described Next to Nowhere as autobiographical, in that the lyrics chronicle her decision to record again, following the breakup of Evangeline.    Next to Nowhere was well received critically, with its success partly due to McKee's focus on her background and roots, both musically and otherwise.

Discography 
Evangeline, 1992
French Quarter Moon, 1993
Louisiana Roots, 2001
I'm That Way, 2009
Next to Nowhere, 2012
Sugarcane Revival, 2015
Dreamwood Acres, 2018

References 

Year of birth missing (living people)
Living people
American singer-songwriters